Leonard Francis Casey (7 May 1888 – 8 October 1964) was a New Zealand cricketer who played six matches of first-class cricket for Otago between 1921 and 1923.

Casey was born at Dunedin in 1888. A right-arm fast-medium bowler, his best first-class figures were 4 for 51 against Auckland in the Plunket Shield in 1921–22.

Casey worked for 41 years for the New Zealand Government Life Insurance Department. He managed the department's branches in Greymouth and Hamilton before being appointed to manage the Christchurch branch in 1941. He retired in 1947. He died at home in Riccarton, Christchurch, in 1964. He and his wife had three children.

References

External links 
 

1888 births
1964 deaths
New Zealand cricketers
Otago cricketers
Cricketers from Dunedin
Businesspeople in insurance